Khireitangiri is a village located in Patna Tehsil in the Kendujhar District in the Indian state of Odisha.

Geography
Khireitangiri is a landlocked area situated in the northeastern part of Kendujhar. It is surrounded by Baunsuli to the north, Nuagaon and Dabarchua to the south, Dalanga to the east, and Bhuluda to the west.  It is 13 kilometers east of the district headquarters of Kendujhar towards Kolkata, 25 kilometers from Patna and 211 kilometers from the state capital, Bhubaneswar.

Notable villages located close to Khireitangiree include Nelung (7 km), Sankiri (7 km), Badaneuli (8 km), Bodapalasa (8 km) and Chakundapal (10 km). Khireitangiree is surrounded by Patna Tehsil to the East, Jhumpura Tehsil and Sukruli Tehsil to the North, and Saharpada Tehsil to the East.

Kendujhar, Karanjia, Champua, Joda, Barbil are the nearest cities.

Demographics
Khireitangiri has 580 families. According to a 2011 census, the Khireitangiree village has a population size of 2,475 (1237 men, 1238 women).

In Khireitangiree, the population of children aged 0–23 is 5,646, 13.05% of the total.
The average sex ratio of Khireitangiree village is 1001, which is higher than the Orissa state average of 979. Child sex ratio for Khireitangiree as per census is 4781, lower than the Orissa average of 941.
In 2011, the literacy rate of Khireitangiree was 72.12% as compared to 72.87% in Orissa. In Khireitangiree, male literacy stands at 82.09% while the female literacy rate is 62.42%.

Language
Odia is the official language.

Politics

Khireitangiri is administrated by a Sarpanch, or Head of Village, who is elected by the people.

Bharatiya Janata Party (BJP) and Biju Janata Dal (BJD) are the major political parties.

Khireitangiree comes under the Patna (Odisha Vidhan Sabha constituency) and the present Member of the Legislative Assembly (MLA) is Jagannath Naik from BJD. It comes under the Keonjhar (Lok Sabha constituency). The present Member of Parliament is Chandrani Murmu from BJD.

Education
 Vishwa Vinayak Degree College 
 Khireitangiree High School
 Khireitangiree U.P.(M.E.) School
 Khireitangiree Primary School
 Saraswati Sishu Mandir
 V. V. Play School

Major festivals
Ratha Yatra, Laxmi Puja, Kali Puja, Mahashivratri, Holi are the village's major festivals.

A biweekly Puja, a religious ritual, is performed in front of Maa Tangaraneepat, a local goddess. The Puja attracts people from nearby areas and neighboring districts.

Transport

The nearby National Highway 49 (also known as the Mumbai Kolkata highway AH46 or Great Eastern Highway) is one of India's busiest roads. It is accessible from major cities of Odisha and neighboring states. Bus services are available to and from Bhubaneswar, Cuttack, Rourkela, Kolkata, Ranchi, Jamshedpur, Baripada, Balasore, Bhadrak, Paradip, Sambalpur, Jharsuguda, Balangir, Angul, Talcher, Kharagpur, etc.
 
Over 10 km away, Kendujhar Railway Station is the nearest railway station. Other major railway stations nearby are Bhubaneswar Railway Station and Rourkela Railway Station which are 211 km and 208 km away, respectively.

References

Villages in Kendujhar district